Yepoella is a monotypic genus of Argentinian jumping spiders containing the single species, Yepoella crassistyli. It was first described by María Elena Galiano in 1970, and is found in Argentina. A second species, Y. tenuistyli Galiano, 1970, was moved to Theriella in 1996.

References

External links
 Diagnostic drawings

Monotypic Salticidae genera
Salticidae
Spiders of Argentina